Campbell Creek may refer to:

Australia 

 Campbell Creek, Queensland, a locality in the North Burnett Region, Queensland

United States 

Campbell Creek (Alaska), a stream in Anchorage
Campbell Creek (California), a tributary of the Trinity River
Campbell Creek (Pine Creek tributary), a stream in Warren County, Pennsylvania
Campbell Creek (Charles Mix County, South Dakota), a stream
Campbell Creek (Harding County, South Dakota), a stream